"Walk Right Now" is a 1981 song written, produced and performed by the Jacksons and issued as the fourth and final single from the group's album, Triumph.

The song was written by Michael Jackson, Jackie Jackson, and Randy Jackson and is about a man fed up with his lover's excuses about her infidelity.

When released, the song performed only modestly on US pop radio, peaking at a number seventy-three, but the song became a hit in the UK, where it peaked at number seven on the UK singles chart.

Record World praised the vocal performance and said that the song "explodes from the outset with an energetic rhythm kick on the bottom and colorful synthesizer lines, guitar riffs and handclaps on top."

The song was performed live, during the Jackson's Triumph Tour in 1981, but only for the first few shows, meaning a performance of the song is very hard to track down.

Personnel
Written and composed by Michael Jackson, Jackie Jackson and Randy Jackson
Produced by the Jacksons
Arranged by Michael Jackson
Lead vocals: Michael Jackson
Background vocals: The Jacksons
Instrumentation:
Piano: Greg Phillinganes
Synthesizers: Greg Phillinganes, Webster Lewis, Michael Boddicker
Guitars: Tito Jackson, David Williams
Bass: Nathan Watts
Drums: Ollie E. Brown
Vibes: Gary Coleman
Percussion: Paulinho da Costa
Horns: Jerry Hey, Kim Hutchcroft, Bill Reichenbach, Larry Hall
Flute: Gary Herbig

Charts

References

Songs about parting
Songs about infidelity

1981 singles
American disco songs
The Jackson 5 songs
Songs written by Michael Jackson
Songs written by Jackie Jackson
1980 songs
Songs written by Randy Jackson (The Jacksons)
Epic Records singles